This is a list of stars arranged by their apparent magnitude – their brightness as observed from Earth. It includes all stars brighter than magnitude +2.50 in visible light, measured using a V-band filter in the UBV photometric system. Stars in binary systems (or other multiples) are listed by their total or combined brightness if they appear as a single star to the naked eye, or listed separately if they do not. As with all magnitude systems in astronomy, the scale is logarithmic and inverted i.e. lower/more negative numbers are brighter.

Most stars on this list appear bright from Earth because they are nearby, not because they are intrinsically luminous. For a list which compensates for the distances, converting the apparent magnitude to the absolute magnitude, see the list of most luminous stars.

Measurement
The Sun is the brightest star as viewed from Earth, at −26.74 mag. The second brightest is Sirius at −1.46 mag. For comparison, the brightest non-stellar objects in the Solar System have maximum brightnesses of: the Moon −12.7 mag, Venus −4.89 mag, Jupiter −2.94 mag, Mars −2.91 mag, Mercury −2.45 mag, and Saturn −0.49 mag.

Any exact order of the visual brightness of stars is not perfectly defined for four reasons:

 Stellar brightness is based on the apparent visual magnitude as perceived by the human eye, from the brightest stars of 1st magnitude to the faintest at 6th magnitude. Since the invention of the optical telescope and the documenting of binary stars and multiple star systems, stellar brightness could be expressed as either individual (separate) or total (combined) magnitude. The table is ordered by combined magnitude of all naked eye components appearing as if it they were single stars. Such multiple star systems are indicated by parentheses showing the individual magnitudes of component stars bright enough to make a detectable contribution. For example, the binary star system Alpha Centauri has the total or combined magnitude of −0.27, while its two component stars have magnitudes of +0.01 and +1.33.
 New or more accurate photometry, standard filters, or adopting differing methods using standard stars can measure stellar magnitudes slightly differently. This may change the apparent order of lists of bright stars. The table shows measured V magnitudes, which use a specific filter that closely approximates human vision. However, other kinds of magnitude systems do exist based on different wavelengths, some well away from the distribution of the visible wavelengths of light, and these apparent magnitudes vary dramatically in the different systems. For example, Betelgeuse has the K-band (infrared) apparent magnitude of −4.05.
 Some stars, like Betelgeuse and Antares, are variable stars, changing their magnitude over days, months or years. In the table, the range of variation is indicated with the symbol "var". Single magnitude values quoted for variable stars come from a variety of sources. Magnitudes shown in the table are either when the stars are at maximum brightness, which is repeated for every cycle (e.g. the eclipsing binary Algol); or, if the variations are small, a simple average magnitude. For red variable stars, specifying a single maximum brightness is often difficult because each cycle produces a different maximum brightness; this is thought to be caused by poorly understood pulsations in stellar evolution processes. Such quoted stellar brightness is sometimes based on the average maximum apparent magnitude from estimated maxima over many observed light-curve cycles, sometimes spanning across centuries. Results often quoted in the literature are not necessarily straightforward and may differ in expressing an alternate value for a singular maximum brightness or as a range of values.
 A few selected stars, thought to be uniformly fixed in brightness, are used as standard stars. These standard stars have carefully determined magnitudes that have been analysed over many years, and are often used to determine other stars' magnitudes or their stellar parameters using comparatively consistent scales.

Nomenclature
All of these stars have multiple valid names or catalogue designations. The table lists their Bayer designation and the most common proper name. Most of the proper names have been approved by the Working Group on Star Names of the International Astronomical Union (IAU). Popular names which have not been approved by the IAU are omitted.

Table

The source of magnitudes cited in this list is the linked Wikipedia articles. This basic list is a catalog of what Wikipedia itself documents. References can be found in the individual articles.

See also

References

External links
The Magnitude system
About stellar magnitudes
The clickable brightest stars

Lists of stars
Stars, List of Brightest
Stars, brightest